Saumarez may refer to:

 Saumarez, New Brunswick
Philip Saumarez (1710–1747), captain of HMS Nottingham, nephew of Admiral James Saumarez
 James Saumarez, 1st Baron de Saumarez (1757–1836), admiral of the Royal Navy
 James Saumarez, 4th Baron de Saumarez (1843–1937), diplomat
 , ship of the Royal Navy.
 , Royal Navy 'S'-class destroyer, saw service in Second World War
 Saumarez (horse), thoroughbred racehorse
 Saumarez Homestead, a homestead in Australia